The Pampanga Sugar Development Company built the first Filipino-financed sugar central in Pampanga, Philippines. It was incorporated in April, 1918.

The Pasudeco Sugar Central was finished in March, 1921, to serve as a central purchasing and processing company for the surrounding sugar plantations. Financed by the Pampanga Sugar Development Company, it was constructed by the Honolulu Iron Works. Its existence became a catalyst for the exponential growth of San Fernando, the capital of the rich sugar-producing province of Pampanga.

On July 12, 1939, two of the founders, Jose de Leon and Augusto Gonzalez, as well as Constabulary Captain Julian Olivas, were gunned down at the administrative offices of Pasudeco. At that time, de Leon and Gonzalez were the two richest men in Pampanga and the biggest Pasudeco shareholders.

Cultural Properties of the Philippines
Landmarks in the Philippines
Sugar companies
Companies based in Pampanga
Agriculture companies of the Philippines